Highway 71 is an east-west highway that passes through the eastern Jezreel Valley and the Beit She'an Valley, below the north slopes of the Gilboa mountains, in northern Israel. The road follows a path parallel to the Harod Creek in the Harod Valley and to the Jezreel Valley railway. The Navot interchange located approximately 10 km southeast of Afula provides a shortcut via Route 675 through the Ta'anakh region from Highway 71 and Beit She'an to Highway 65 and central Israel.

Plans
The portion of the highway between the Navot interchange and Yissachar junction is a four-lane limited-access road, with the rest of the highway consisting of two lanes. In 2020 the National Roads Authority (Netivei Yisrael) published a design-build contract to upgrade the remainder of the highway from Yissachar to Beit She'an to a four-lane limited access road and conversion of most of the main intersections to interchanges. This busy section serves local and inter-city traffic to Beit She'an, as well as frequent freight traffic to and from the border crossing with Jordan.

Intersections

Places of interest on Highway 71
 Ma'ayan Harod National Park

 Trumpeldor House
 Beit She'an National Park
 Tel Ashtori
 
Mishkan Museum of Art

See also
List of highways in Israel

71